Cornelis Manilius (active 1548–1558) was a printer and bookseller in the city of Ghent whose business was continued by his sons Ghileyn and Gauthier. He was also a poet.

Born in Bruges, Manilius established his business in Ghent in 1548. He married Collyne van Eestenrycke.
 
His poetic works include a verse account of Prince Philip's solemn entry into Ghent on 13 July 1549, and an allegorical drama on death.

References

16th-century births
16th-century deaths
Businesspeople from Ghent
16th-century printers
Poets of the Habsburg Netherlands
Businesspeople from Bruges